This is a list of Australian musical composers.

Romantic

 Isaac Nathan (1790–1864)
 Carl Ferdinand August Linger (1810–1862)
 Charles Sandys Packer (1810–1883)
 Francis Hartwell Henslowe (1811–1878)
 William Vincent Wallace (1812–1865)
 Rosendo Salvado (1814–1900)
 William Stanley (1820–1902)
 Charles Edward Horsley (1822–1876)
 Frederick Ellard (1824–1874)
 Siede, Julius (1825–1903)
 Paolo Giorza (1832–1914)
 William Robinson (1834–1897)
 George William Torrance (1835–1907)
 Frederick Augustus Packer (1839–1902)
 Joseph Summers (1839–1917)
 Leon Francois Victor Caron (1850–1907)
 Moritz Heuzenroeder (1849–1897)
 MacCarthy, Charles William (1848–1919)
 Guglielmo Enrico Lardelli (1850–1910)
 Alice Charbonnet-Kellermann (1850–1913)
 John Albert Delany (1852–1907)
 Cawthorne, Charles Wittowitto (1854–1925)
 Barnett, Neville George (1854–1895)
 Hermann Rosendoff (1860–1935)
 John Lemmone (1861–1949)
Mona Margaret McBurney (1862–1932)
 Georgette Augusta Christina Peterson (1863–1947)
 Florence Maud Ewart (1864–1949)
 Alfred Wheeler (composer) (1865–1949)
 George Howard Clutsam (1866–1951)
 Jack (Moolbong) Johnson (1868–1943)

 Alex Frame Lithgow (1870–1929)
 Vince Courtney (unknown active 1907–1939)
 Ernest Truman
 Rosendo Salvado (1870–1900)
 Johannes Heyer (1872–1945)
 Fritz Hart (1874–1949)
 Louis Lavater (1876–1953)
 Reginald Alberto Agrati Stoneham (1879–1942)
 Frederick Septimus Kelly (1881–1916 killed in action)
 Hooper Brewster-Jones (1887–1949)
 Percy Code (1888–1953)
 Horace Keats (1895–1945)
 John (Jack) Sinclair Lumsdaine (1895–1948)
 Walter Marwood Du Boulay (1898–1947)
 Hugo Alpen (1842–1917)
 Thomas Bulch (1862–1930)
 Roy Agnew (1891–1944)
 Stephen Moreno (1889–1953)
 Walter James Redfern Turner (1889–1946)
 Leo Paul Schramm (1892–1953)
 Thomas Wood (1892–1950)

Modern/Contemporary

 Mirrie Hill (1889–1986)
 Arthur Benjamin (1893–1960)
 John Antill (1904–1986)
 Charles Zwar (1911–1989)
 Peggy Glanville-Hicks (1912–1990)
 Alfred Hill (1869–1960)
 Dulcie Holland (1913–2000)
 Miriam Hyde (1913–2005)
 Peter Sculthorpe (1929–2014)
 John Carmichael (born 1930)
 Malcolm Williamson (1931–2003)
 Betty Beath (born 1932)
 Michael Brimer (born 1933)
 Colin Brumby (1933–2018)
 Don Kay (born 1933)
 Larry Sitsky (born 1933)
 Ann Carr-Boyd (born 1938)
 Philip Bračanin (born 1942)
 Ross Edwards (born 1943)
 Alison Bauld (born 1944)
 Barry Conyngham (born 1944)
 George Palmer (born 1947)
 Brenton Broadstock (born 1952)
 Carl Vine (born 1954)
 Andrew Ford (born 1957)
 Elena Kats-Chernin (born 1957)
 Nigel Westlake (born 1958)
 Andrew Schultz (born 1960)
 Brett Dean (born 1961)
 Mary Finsterer (born 1962)
 Deborah Cheetham (born 1964)
 Georges Lentz (born 1965)
 Constantine Koukias (born 1965)
 Liza Lim (born 1966)
 Katia Tiutiunnik (born 1967)
 David Banney (born 1967)
 Lynette Lancini (born 1970)
 Damien Ricketson (born 1973)
 Julian Cochran (born 1974)
 Nicholas Vines (born 1976)
 Michael Sollis (born 1985)

See also
 List of Australian composers

References

External links
 Pleskun, Stephen. (2012) A Chronological History of Australian Composers and Their Compositions: 1901–1945. Xlibris Corp, Hobart.
 Colonial Music list by Musicologist Graeme Skinner
 Collection of Quadrille MIDI files

 
Australian music history
Australian